Beutepanzer (German) is the German designation for a captured armored fighting vehicle. The Germans used Beutepanzers to gain insight into enemy technology and to augment their own armored forces.

Beutepanzers were usually repainted to sport distinctive national emblems and unit insignia in order to reduce friendly fire from other Axis forces.

First World War 
During World War I, the Germans had many Beutepanzers in their arsenal, far exceeding the production of their own tanks. Beutepanzers were given a German national cross and new camouflage. By the end of the war, a total of 170 Beutepanzers were still in running condition with 35 reported to be battle ready.  In comparison, over a third of the 20 A7V tanks built by Germany had been destroyed or captured by then.

Second World War 

Beutepanzers played an important role in the Wehrmacht. After the occupation of Czechoslovakia in 1939, many Czech tanks were claimed. In October 1940, the Heeresamt ordered two of each Beutepanzer type to be delivered to the Army Weapons Office for evaluation. Beutepanzers were used by the German Army on all fronts.

During the Western Campaign, Germany had captured 691 British tanks in total with an estimate of 350 being reusable. Most Beutepanzers captured during the campaign were modified into observation tanks or ammunition transports.  Heavily damaged units were salvaged for spare parts. Additionally, roughly 1,800 modern (non-FT-17s) French tanks were captured during the May–June campaign and returned to service as Beutepanzers, alongside a similar number destroyed beyond repair.

The Germans captured many T-26 and BT tanks on the Eastern Front from 1941 to 1942.

The Germans were not the only users of captured tanks, though other nations usually did not deploy captured vehicles into combat. The British were able to secure a Tiger 1 near Tunis in April 1943 (Tiger 131), and the Soviets soon captured a Tiger 1 tank thereafter.

A complete list of all Beutepanzers in German service are available in Chamberlain and Doyle's Encyclopedia of German Tanks of World War Two.

See also
List of foreign vehicles used by Nazi Germany in World War II

References

World War I tanks
World War II tanks
Tanks of the Cold War